Leach is an unincorporated community and census-designated place (CDP) in southwestern Delaware County, Oklahoma, United States, along U.S. Route 412 and 412 Alternate. The population was 237 at the 2010 census.

History
The community has the name of J. R. Leach, an early settler. On May 20, 2019, a nocturnal EF2 tornado was reported to have caused extensive damage in the vicinity of Leach.

Geography
Leach is located in southwestern Delaware County at  (36.197845, -94.913359).

Demographics

As of the census of 2000, there were 220 people, 81 households, and 66 families residing in the CDP. The population density was 35.3 people per square mile (13.6/km2). There were 94 housing units at an average density of 15.1/sq mi (5.8/km2). The racial makeup of the CDP was 48.64% White, 40.45% Native American, and 10.91% from two or more races. Hispanic or Latino of any race were 1.36% of the population.

There were 81 households, out of which 38.3% had children under the age of 18 living with them, 67.9% were married couples living together, 9.9% had a female householder with no husband present, and 17.3% were non-families. 16.0% of all households were made up of individuals, and 3.7% had someone living alone who was 65 years of age or older. The average household size was 2.72 and the average family size was 2.99.

In the CDP, the population was spread out, with 28.6% under the age of 18, 8.2% from 18 to 24, 26.4% from 25 to 44, 26.4% from 45 to 64, and 10.5% who were 65 years of age or older. The median age was 32 years. For every 100 females, there were 103.7 males. For every 100 females age 18 and over, there were 109.3 males.

The median income for a household in the CDP was $30,972, and the median income for a family was $31,964. Males had a median income of $23,646 versus $24,375 for females. The per capita income for the CDP was $11,119. About 17.3% of families and 18.3% of the population were below the poverty line, including 16.9% of those under the age of eighteen and 30.0% of those 65 or over.

The nearby town of Kansas, Oklahoma is the home of Born Again Pews, a church furniture manufacturing company. With 16 employees, it is the largest private employer in the area.

References

Further reading
 Foreman, Grant. "Early Post Offices of Oklahoma". Chronicles of Oklahoma 6:3 (September 1928) 271–298. (accessed March 8, 2007)
 Shirk, George H. Oklahoma Place Names. Norman: University of Oklahoma Press, 1987. .

Census-designated places in Delaware County, Oklahoma
Census-designated places in Oklahoma